The Luke Priddis Foundation (LPF) is a charitable organisation established, in 2006, by rugby league player Luke Priddis, to help "maximise the services and opportunities available to Autistic and special needs children" and their families in the greater Sydney region.

History 
The LPF was founded in 2006 after Luke’s son, Cooper, was diagnosed with ASD. When Luke and his wife, Holly, noticed the lack of services in the western Sydney region, they started the LPF to support the current services and to begin their own.
To finance these actions, the LPF hosts various community functions, receives sponsorship, and accepts donations.

Activities 
The LPF is currently involved in:
 ASD related workshops
 Forums and seminars, for both laypersons and professionals
 PlayConnect and Mytime Playgroups for children with ASD and ASD like symptoms
 ASD awareness events, including the annual Walk for Autism
 Lobbying the Australian Government for increased support for families with children with ASD
 Supporting ASD early intervention providers

References

External links 
 Luke Priddis Foundation website

Autism-related organizations
2006 establishments in Australia
Organizations established in 2006
Mental health organisations in Australia
Disability organisations based in Australia